The 2022 Dartmouth Big Green football team represented Dartmouth College in the 2022 NCAA Division I FCS football season as a member of the Ivy League. The team was led by 22nd-year head coach Buddy Teevens and played its home games at Memorial Field.

Previous season

The Big Green finished the 2021 season with a record of 9–1, 6–1 Ivy League play to win the Ivy championship with Princeton.

Schedule

Game summaries

Valparaiso

at Sacred Heart

Penn

at Yale

New Hampshire

at Columbia

Harvard

at No. 25 Princeton

at Cornell

Brown

References

Dartmouth
Dartmouth Big Green football seasons
Dartmouth Big Green football